Alfred Labouchere (19 January 1867 – 24 January 1953) was a Dutch épée and sabre fencer. He competed at the 1908 and 1928 Summer Olympics.

References

External links
 

1867 births
1953 deaths
Dutch male épée fencers
Olympic fencers of the Netherlands
Fencers at the 1908 Summer Olympics
Fencers at the 1928 Summer Olympics
Fencers from Amsterdam
Dutch male sabre fencers
20th-century Dutch people